Sáenz or Saenz may refer to:

People
 Aarón Sáenz Garza (1891–1983), Mexican politician
 Antonio Fernandez Saenz (born 1947), Spanish-Brazilian lawyer and human rights defender
 Antonio Sáenz (1780–1825), Argentine statesman, educator and cleric
 Blas Antonio Sáenz (1800–unknown), Nicaraguan politician
 Carlos Enrique Díaz Sáenz Valiente (1917–1956), Argentine Olympic sport shooter
 Francine Carrel Saenz Diaz (born 2004), Filipina actress and model
 Diana Sáenz (born 1989), Costa Rican footballer
 Eddie Saenz (1923–1971) American football player for the Washington Redskins of the National Football League
 Francisco Javier Sáenz de Oiza (1918–2000), Spanish architect
 Frankie Saenz (born 1980), American Ultimate Fighting Championship mixed martial artist
 Jaime Sáenz (1921–1986), Bolivian poet, novelist, and short story writer
 Joaquín Sáenz y Arriaga (1899–1976), Mexican Catholic priest and theologian
 Joe Saenz (born 1975), gangster and former fugitive
 Luis Sáenz Peña (1822–1907), president of Argentina 1892–1895
 Manuela Sáenz (1797–1856), revolutionary hero of South America
 Moisés Sáenz (1888–1941), education advocate and reformer of education in Mexico
 Olmedo Sáenz (born 1970), Major League Baseball player
 Pedro Rubiano Sáenz (born 1932), Roman Catholic Archbishop of Bogotá
 Pedro Segura y Sáenz (1880–1957), Spanish Cardinal and Archbishop
 Ralph Saenz (a.k.a. Michael Starr; born 1965) American singer, songwriter, and musician of the comedic glam metal band Steel Panther
 Roque Sáenz Peña (1851–1914), president of Argentina 1910–1914
 Roy Sáenz (born 1944), retired Costa Rican football player
 Soraya Sáenz de Santamaría (born 1971), Spanish politician
 Stephen Sáenz (born 1990), American-born Mexican athlete
 Suso (Jesús Fernández Sáenz de la Torre) (born 1993), Spanish football player
 Waldir Sáenz (born 1973), retired Peruvian footballer

Other uses
Sáenz (Buenos Aires Underground), a station planned for 2018
Saenz v. Roe, a U.S. Supreme Court case relating to travel between U.S. states

See also
 Avenida Roque Sáenz Peña, a main road in the San Nicolás quarter of Buenos Aires, Argentina
 Sáenz Peña (disambiguation)
 Saens (disambiguation)